A  or rice paddle is a large flat spoon used in East Asian cuisine. It is used to stir and to serve rice, and to mix vinegar into the rice for sushi.

Shamoji are traditionally made from bamboo, wood, or lacquer, and nowadays often from plastic. The shamoji is dipped in water frequently during use to prevent rice from sticking to it. Some expensive plastic shamoji have non-stick surfaces. Metal is rarely used, as this is more likely to cut rice grains or to damage the hangiri wooden tub traditionally used for mixing.

It is said to have been first devised by a monk on Itsukushima, Hiroshima Prefecture.

Modern rice cookers may include a shamoji in the box, usually made of white plastic.

Shamoji are also used to crush vegetables, such as garlic and cucumbers, as cleavers are used in Western cuisine.

The shamoji has also been a symbol of unity between the mother and wife in Japanese society.  In one tradition, it was passed down from one generation to the next to symbolize the family duties that were handed down.

See also
List of Japanese cooking utensils

References

East Asian food preparation utensils
Japanese food preparation utensils